These are the official results of the women's shot put event at the 1992 Summer Olympics, held on 5 August 1992, at the Olympic Stadium in Barcelona, Spain. There were a total number of 18 participating athletes. The top 12 and ties and all those reaching 18.50 metres advanced to the final.

Medalists

Abbreviations

Records

Qualification

Group A

Group B

Final

See also
 1988 Women's Olympic Shot Put (Seoul)
 1990 Women's European Championships Shot Put (Split)
 1993 Women's World Championships Shot Put (Stuttgart)
 1994 Women's European Championships Shot Put (Helsinki)

References

External links
 Official Report
 Results

S
Shot put at the Olympics
1992 in women's athletics
Women's events at the 1992 Summer Olympics